Google Developer Day events were one-day web developer-focused gatherings around the world held annually by Google. They include seminars and codelabs focused on building of web, mobile, and enterprise applications with Google and open web technologies such as Android, HTML5, Chrome, App Engine, Google Web Toolkit and give participants an excellent chance to learn about Google developer products as well as meet the engineers who work on them.

Occurrences

 2007: May - June in Mountain View, California, USA, Sao Paulo, Brazil, London, United Kingdom, Paris, France, Madrid, Spain, Hamburg, Germany, Moscow, Russia, Tokyo, Japan, Sydney, Australia, and Beijing, China.
 2008: Jun 10 in Yokohama, Japan, Jun 12 in Beijing, China, Jun 14 in Taipei, Taiwan, Jun 18 in Sydney, Australia, Jun 23 in Mexico City, Mexico, Jun 27 in Sao Paulo, Brazil, Sep 16 in London, England, Sep 18 in Paris, France, Sep 23 in Munich, Germany, Sep 25 in Madrid, Spain, Oct 18 in Bangalore, India, Oct 21 in Milan, Italy, Oct 24 in Prague, Czech, Oct 28 in Moscow, Russia, Nov 2 in Tel Aviv, Israel.
 2009: Jun 5 in Beijing, China, Jun 9 in Yokohama, Japan, Jun 29 in Sao Paulo, Brazil, Nov 6 in Prague, Czech Republic, Nov 10 in Moscow, Russia.
 2010: Sep 28 in Tokyo, Japan, Oct 29 in Sao Paulo, Brazil, Nov 9 in Munich, Germany, Nov 12 in Moscow, Russia, and Nov 16 in Prague, Czech Republic.
 2011: Sep 16 in Sao Paulo, Brazil, Sep 19–20 in Buenos Aires, Argentina, Oct 10 in Moscow, Russia, Oct 18 in Prague, Oct 26 in Beijing, Czech Republic, Nov 1 in Tokyo, Japan, Nov 3 in Shanghai, Nov 8 in Sydney, Australia, Nov 11 in Guangzhou, Nov 13 in Tel-Aviv, Israel, Nov 19 in Berlin, Germany.
 2016: Sep 5 & 6 in Europe; Dec 7 in Beijing.
 2017: Dec 13 & 14 in Shanghai.
 2018: Sep 20 & 21 in Shanghai.
 2019: Sep 10 & 11 in Shanghai.

Aims
Developer Days are a marketing technique used by Google to launch new products and introduce customers to innovations often presenting these in the form of games. It also seeks to encourage the participation of software developers and to attract developers who can improve web applications. A stated company goal is to "cultivate a better relationship with programmers, particularly those on the cutting edge of mashup development, a relatively new style of application development that combines information from different Web sites." Such developer programs are becoming a common feature of how companies promote Web applications and are used by Amazon, eBay, Microsoft and Yahoo. In fact, Yahoo was a pioneer in the introduction developer days with its Hack Day in autumn 2006.

History
 2007: The first ever Developer Day event took place in Sydney, Australia to be followed by 9 other international locations. It provided talks and demonstrations for Gears, Web toolkit, Geo, Mapplets together with a YouTube API session writeup. 
 2008: Google unveiled its HTC android phone. It also included presentations on Chrome, AJAX and the Web Toolkit and demos for various applications such as Gears. 
 2011: The largest per-country GDD took place in China: within a month time, 3 GDD events took place, in the cities of Beijing, Shanghai, and Guangzhou, with more than 3,000 developer attendees. 
 2014: Google was the first company to release a smart watch (beating Apple to the launch at its annual Development Day in San Francisco.

Planned Google Developer Day-Game Developers Conference (GDC)

This is a major Developer Day event which will present Google games and the latest innovations. Google product managers will be available to deliver technical advice and the agenda includes:

 Growth Hacking with Play Games
 Engaging Your Entire Community
 Making Money on Google Play: Best Practices in Monetization
 Grow Your Game Revenue with AdMob
 Okay Glass, Play a Game
 The Next Level of In-game Advertising
 From Players to Customers: Tracking Revenue with Google Analytics
 Take Your Users to the Next Level
 Build Games that Scale in the Cloud
 Looking to the Future
 From Box2D to Liquid Fun: Just Add Water-like Particles!
 Bringing the Power of YouTube to your Games

See also
 2009 Google Developer Day in Beijing event photos
 2011 Google Developer Day 3-city events in China photos
Google I/O
AtGoogleTalks
Android Developer Day

References

External links
 
 Google Developers Blog on Blogspot

Web-related events
Developer Day